Richard Allen Schwieger, known professionally as Rick Allen (born June 17, 1969), is an American television personality, play-by-play announcer, and voice-over artist. He currently is at NBC Sports as the play-by-play commentator for NASCAR's Cup Series and Xfinity Series, on an interim basis for the International Motor Sports Association, and for NBC Sports coverage of track & field. He previously had done play-by-play broadcasting for Fox Sports's coverage of NASCAR's Camping World Truck Series and voice-over work for Goodyear, Sears, Alltel, and Toyota among many others.

Biography
Allen was the third of four siblings. Allen grew up in Grand Island, Nebraska, and was a walk on for the University of Nebraska Track and Field team, where he was a letter winner all four seasons, a three-time All-American in the sport, winning two Big Eight Conference decathlon titles (1991–92). He received his bachelor's degree of communications from the university.  After graduation, he worked as a public address announcer for the University of Nebraska athletic department, and later at local dirt oval racetracks including Eagle Raceway, where Fox Sports found him.

From 2003 to mid-2014, Allen worked for Fox Sports, where his main duty was calling the NASCAR Camping World Truck Series and ARCA Racing Series on SPEED and later Fox Sports 1. He occasionally covered Nationwide Series (now Xfinity Series) events.

On December 4, 2013, it was announced that Allen will become the lead announcer for NASCAR on NBC starting in 2015.  In early 2014, he began his NBC duties as host of their daily studio program NASCAR America, while still working for Fox.

During the Truck Series Eldora race on July 23, 2014, Allen announced that it would be his last race at Fox Sports, as he was now bound only to NBC. As most of his work was with the Truck Series, he received a standing ovation at the Truck Series drivers' meeting before the race. Allen was replaced by Steve Byrnes until Byrnes died from head and neck cancer in April 2015.

It was announced in 2016 that Allen would be joining the IndyCar Series on NBC broadcast team for select Verizon IndyCar Series events beginning at Phoenix in 2016, filling in for regular IndyCar play-by-play announcer Leigh Diffey because Diffey worked with NBC's Formula One coverage.

References

1969 births
Living people
Nebraska Cornhuskers men's track and field athletes
Track and field broadcasters
People from Grand Island, Nebraska